Terthreutis orbicularis is a species of moth of the family Tortricidae. It is found in Sichuan, China.

References

Moths described in 1993
Archipini